Pyongyang Sinmun (Pyongyang News) is a North Korean newspaper founded on 1 June 1957 by Kim Il-sung. It launched an online version on 1 January 2005. It is published by the Workers' Party of Korea Pyongyang Municipal Committee six times per week under the editorship of Song Rak-gyun. Although technically a local newspaper, it is distributed nationwide and stories cover news from other regions as well. The print is four pages. It has a circulation of 4,3 million. The Pyongyang Times is its foreign language edition.

See also
List of newspapers in North Korea
Media of North Korea

References

Newspapers published in North Korea
Mass media in North Korea
Publications established in 1957
Korean-language newspapers
Mass media in Pyongyang
Publications of the Workers' Party of Korea
1957 establishments in North Korea